The unnamed album (known colloquially as Black Album, and sometimes just named Kino) is the eighth and final studio album of the Soviet rock group Kino. It was released in December 1990 by Metadigital on vinyl. The rough demo version was recorded in the Latvian village Plieņciems shortly before the death of the frontman Viktor Tsoi in a car crash. The remaining members of Kino completed the album as a tribute to Tsoi.

The album's producer Yuri Aizenshpis said that the demo tape survived inside Tsoi's car when he crashed fatally, however the band's guitarist, Yuri Kasparyan, has disputed this and stated that it was in his own car and not Tsoi's.

The song "Cuckoo" ("Кукушка") is considered by many fans to be an unwitting swan song for the band. The song's themes range from mortality to existential guilt. It became one of the band's most well-known songs.

It was originally released on vinyl by the studio Metadigital in December 1990. On this original vinyl issue, no track names were given, just the text  Producer: Yu. Aizenshpis  and a photo of the band. A lyric sheet was included, but the songs were just titled 1 to 8. The track names were revealed on the 1994 CD reissue on Moroz. In 2021, the original album was remastered and reissued by Maschina Records; Yuri Kasparyan, and Viktor Tsoi's son, Alexander, were involved in the production and approval process.

Track listing
"Кончится лето" (Summer is Ending) – 5:55
"Красно-жёлтые дни" (Reddish-Yellow Days) – 5:49
"Нам с тобой" ((For) You and Me) – 4:49
"Звезда" (Star) – 4:29
"Кукушка" (Cuckoo) – 6:39
"Когда твоя девушка больна" (When Your Girlfriend is Ill) – 4:20
"Муравейник" (Anthill) – 5:17
"Следи за собой" (Watch Yourself) – 4:59
"Сосны на морском берегу" (Pines at the Sea Shore) – 5:16
"Завтра война" (War Tomorrow) – 0:35

Tracks 9 and 10 were added to the 1998 remaster by Moroz. As stated above, the tracks did not have names until 1994, so fans made up their own names for these songs.

Personnel
Viktor Tsoi (Виктор Цой) – Vocals, Guitar
Yuri Kasparyan (Юрий Каспарян) – Lead Guitar
Igor Tikhomirov (Игорь Тихомиров) – Bass Guitar
Georgy Guryanov (Георгий Гурьянов) – Drum Machine

Covers
The song was covered by Olga Kormukhina, by Polina Gagarina (for the 2015 movie Battle for Sevastopol) and by Zemfira.

References

1990 albums
Kino (band) albums
Albums produced by Yuri Aizenshpis
1990 in the Soviet Union
Albums published posthumously